Thenkatchiperumalnatham is a village in the Udayarpalayam taluk of Ariyalur district, Tamil Nadu, India.

Demographics 

As per the 2001 census, Thenkatchiperumalnatham had a total population of 1872 with 961 males and 911 females.

References 

Villages in Ariyalur district